Joyce A. Spiliotis (December 27, 1946 – November 29, 2012) was an American politician.

She was born in Peabody, Massachusetts, and represented the 12th Essex district in the Massachusetts House of Representatives from 2003 until her death in 2012 and was a Peabody City Councilor from 1994 to 2003.

References

1946 births
Massachusetts city council members
Democratic Party members of the Massachusetts House of Representatives
People from Peabody, Massachusetts
Women state legislators in Massachusetts
2012 deaths
Women city councillors in Massachusetts
21st-century American women